Sheffield Institute of Arts Gallery is a university art gallery in Sheffield, England. Part of Sheffield Hallam University the gallery is based in the Furnival Building in Sheffield's Cultural Industries Quarter. It is open to the public.
The gallery aims to bring nationally and internationally recognised works of art, design and media arts to Sheffield as well as showing some of the work of academics and students in the Sheffield Institute of Arts. The gallery is managed by a gallery committee representing the main subject groups of the Sheffield Institute of Arts, individual exhibitions are curated by academic specialists in the University.

References

External links
Official site

Art museums and galleries in Sheffield
Contemporary art galleries in England
Sheffield Hallam University
University museums in the United Kingdom